is a 1960 Japanese chambara ("sword-fighting") film directed by Daisuke Itō starring Raizo Ichikawa, originally released by Daiei Film (now known as Kadokawa Pictures).

Plot 
The film depicts the scarring of Yosaburo (Raizo Ichikawa) at the hands of yakuza thugs who catch him with mistress of the gang boss. Despite the physical and emotional scars he now carries with him, Yosaburo falls for a young noblewoman (Manami Fuji). The rest of the film follows the two as they fend off attacks from gangs and the police.

Cast 
 Raizo Ichikawa as Yosaburo
 Keiko Awaji
 Manami Fuji
 Tamao Nakamura
 Namiji Yamato
 Ryosuke Kagawa
 Chieko Murata
 Eitaro Ozawa

Film Festivals 
Scar Yosaburo has been part of a number of film festivals celebrating the chambara genre, and also in retrospectives of the careers of Raizo Ichikawa and Shintaro Katsu in the last decade. The film was also featured in the Japan Society of New York's film festival celebrating the Chambara genre during the winter 2009–2010 season.

Trivia 
 The character of Yosaburo is based on a popular character in Kabuki theater of the same name (although there are slight variations). Like the Yosaburo portrayed in Kirare Yosaburo, he is scarred all over his upper body and face.

References

External links 
 
 

1960 films
Daiei Film films
Films scored by Ichirō Saitō
Films directed by Daisuke Itō (film director)
1960s Japanese films